SCMS  Engineering College (SSET), established 2001, is a technical institute on a  campus at Karukutty, Ernakulam District, Kerala. It offers bachelor's and master's degree in engineering and computer administration in affiliation with Mahatma Gandhi University and A P J Abdul Kalam Technological University.

About
The SSET draws inspiration and expertise from the School of Communication and Management Studies (SCMS) – the business school of the group. The ISO 9001 quality certified business school is highly rated by India's leading business journals. The SCMS is the only AICTE accredited business school in the state of Kerala. SCMS has also received, in recognition of its performance, substantial grants from the AICTE, Government of India.

Recognition and affiliation
The SSET is recognized by the All India Council for Technical Education (AICTE), Govt. of India vide their letter No... 770-54-023(NDEG)/ET/2001 dated 27 June 2001. The Mahatma Gandhi University granted affiliation in accordance with the G.O.No.(MS) 88/2001/H.Edn. dated 21 July 2001.

Departments
The college has the following departments:
Department of Computer Science Engineering
Department of Electronics and Communication Engineering
Department of Mechanical Engineering,
Department of Automobile Engineering,
Department of Civil Engineering,
Department of Electrical Engineering,
Department of MCA.

Each department has its own faculty, supporting staff and technical instructors working under the Head of the Department.

Intake
SSET has an intake capacity of 60 students in each branch. Mechanical Engineering, Electronics and Communication Engineering, Civil Engineering branches have two batches with 120 seats. With a total sanctioned intake capacity of 540 students in six branches SSET is the second largest engineering college set up under the self-financing scheme in Kerala.

Campus
The SSET is situated in the midst of a  rubber plantation. Hostels for junior boys and girls are in the campus, close to the college building. Senior men's hostel is however outside the campus. There is also an 'L' shaped ground situated outside the main campus.

The Dr. Pradeep P. Tevannoor learning resource centre is the digitized library facility of the college with over 20,000 volumes of books made available. The library subscribes to all major international/national journals and publications. The cafeteria can serve 300 students at a time. The college has a spacious multi purpose auditorium within the main campus. The main campus also accommodates various sports facilities for basketball, badminton and cricket. The football ground is outside the main campus. The entrance block houses the bank, ATM, bookstore and security staff building. The SCMS School of Architecture also functions inside the main campus.

References

External links
 

Private engineering colleges in Kerala
Colleges affiliated to Mahatma Gandhi University, Kerala
Engineering colleges in Ernakulam district
Educational institutions established in 2001
2001 establishments in Kerala